Jacob "Jake" Alapaki Highland (February 23, 1932 – November 23, 2015) was an American former volleyball player who competed in the 1964 Summer Olympics. He was born in Honolulu, Territory of Hawaii.

References

1932 births
2015 deaths
American men's volleyball players
Olympic volleyball players of the United States
Volleyball players at the 1964 Summer Olympics
People from Honolulu